The Nine Cardinal Principles of the rule of the English Rajah is the Preamble of the Sarawak Constitution 1941. The document setting forth the Sarawak Constitution 1941 opened by enunciating the Cardinal Principle edict by Charles Vyner Brooke, the White Rajah of Sarawak on 24 September 1941. Known as the Nine Cardinal Principles of the rule of the White Rajah, it was later adopted into the Nine Cardinal Principles of the rule of the English Rajah. 

The Cardinal Principles are set out in the First Schedule to the Sarawak (Constitution) Order in Council, 1956. They originally formed part of the Preamble to Order No. C-21 (Constitution), 1941, enacted by the Rajah of Sarawak. these were;

That Sarawak is the heritage of Our Subjects and is held in trust by Ourselves for them.
That social and education services shall be developed and improved and the standard of living of the people of Sarawak shall steadily be raised.
That never shall any person or persons be granted rights inconsistent with those of the people of this country or be in any way permitted to exploit Our Subjects or those who have sought Our protection and care.
That justice shall be freely obtainable and that the Rajah and every public servant shall be easily accessible to the public.
That freedom of expression both in speech and in writing shall be permitted and encouraged and that everyone shall be entitled to worship as he pleases.
That public servants shall ever remember that they are but the servants of the people on whose goodwill and co-operation they are entirely dependent.
That so far as may be Our Subjects of whatever race or creed shall be freely and impartially admitted to offices in Our Service, the duties of which they may be qualified by their education, ability and integrity duly to discharge.
That the goal of self-government shall always be kept in mind, that the people of Sarawak shall be entrusted in due course with the governance of themselves, and that continuous efforts shall be made to hasten the reaching of this goal by educating them in the obligations, the responsibilities, and the privileges of citizenship.
That the general policy of Our predecessors and Ourselves whereby the various races of the State have been enabled to live in happiness and harmony together shall be adhered to by Our successors and Our servants and all who may follow them hereafter.

References

External links
 

Legal documents
1941 documents
History of Sarawak